Hasrat Mohani Colony is a neighbourhood in the Korangi District in eastern Karachi, Pakistan. It is named after the Indian Urdu poet Maulana Hasrat Mohani.

History
Hasrat Mohani Colony was formerly a union council and was part of Korangi Town, which was an administrative unit that was disbanded in 2011. Hasrat Mohani Colony Union Council consisted primarily of Hasrat Mohani Colony, Sectors 51-A, and 51-B.

Demographics
It is populated predominantly by Urdu speaking Muhajirs.

References

External links 
 Karachi Website.
 Korangi.

Neighbourhoods of Karachi
Korangi Town